Take the Train is a card game marketed by the U.S. Playing Card Company under its Bicycle Games sub-brand. The object of the game is to have the most train fares remaining at the end of the game; train fares are distributed evenly among players, and are lost when a player cannot play from their hand and for each card left when a player empties their hand.

Setup

The game includes:
 a deck of 58 cards:
 48 number cards (1–12) in four colors: blue, green, magenta and orange
 Four "Station" cards, one of each color
 Two "Free Ride" cards
 Two "End of Line" cards
 Two "Transfer" cards (optional)
 100 blue coin-sized "Train Fare" tokens
 Plastic tray for storage, and for holding extra cards and paid fares
 Instruction pamphlet

Players choose the dealer by some fair means. For the normal game, the Transfer cards are removed, but they can be left in for a more advanced variation. The dealer shuffles while the train fares are distributed evenly (any remainder is placed in the tray, known as the Conductor's Pot). The dealer then deals the cards face-down, one at a time; 13 cards each for 2 or 3 players, 8 for 4 or more. The remaining cards are placed face-down to form the draw pile, known as the Conductor's Hand.

Play

Starting on the dealer's left, a player checks to see if they have a Station card. If so, they play it to start the first line. If not, their turn passes (they do not need to pay a Fare at this time). If no player has a station, players draw in turn until one is found (again, not yet paying fares).

Once the first Station has been played, that line is open. Players in clockwise fashion proceed to make one of the following plays per turn:

 If a player has one or more cards of the same color as an open line that can be played in ascending (from 7 to 12) or descending (from 6 to 1) order to an open end of the line, he may do so. Multiple cards can be played, but the cards played must be played to one end of one line only, and the player must play in sequential order.
 If a player has another Station card, he may play it along with a sequence of the same color descending from 6 or ascending from 7, if any, to open a new line.
 If a player holds a specialty card (see below) that allows him to make a valid play, he may do so.
 If a player cannot make any play, he must "Take the Train"; he pays one Fare to the Conductor's Pot, and draws a card from the Conductor's Hand if it has not been exhausted. If there are no further cards to draw, players must still pay the Fare.

Ending the game
The game is over when one player empties his hand of cards, or alternately if a player runs out of Fares. All other players pay one Fare to the pot for each card, and the player with the most Fares left wins.

Multi-round play
The game can be played in rounds, with score kept based on the number of Fares the winning player had left. Play can then be to 100 or 250, or the highest total after a number of rounds.

Specialty cards

Free Ride
A Free Ride card is a wild card that can stand in for any one number card (it cannot be a specialty or Station card). As the number card it stands in for exists, a player may, on their turn, play the card for which the Free Ride is standing in, and take the Free Ride for their own use. This counts as the play for their turn.

End of Line
An End of Line card, when placed on one end of a line, prohibits players from adding to that side of the line. To play cards that would normally be played on that end, the players must instead "wrap around" the other end of the line. For instance, if the End of Line was played on the 8 of a line, the 9 of that color, which would normally be played on the 8, instead becomes the last card that can be played on that line; the descending side must "wrap around" from 1 to 12 to 11 etc. until the 9 can be played.

Transfer
A Transfer card, used in more advanced variants, allows a player to "split" a line by branching off a sequence of a differing color, beginning from a card of which the player holds a card of the same number in a different color. For instance, with the Magenta line open, a player may not have a playable Magenta card, but DOES have an Orange 5 and a Transfer card, and the Magenta 5 has been played. The player plays the Transfer card next to the Magenta 5, then plays the Orange 5 on the other side. Orange cards 4 to 1 can now be played off of the 5 heading away from the station. Any cards that would normally lie between the Station and the number at which the Transfer was played, as well as anything to the other side of the Station, cannot be played until the Station is played.

References

Card games introduced in 2007
Shedding-type card games
Dedicated deck card games